The 1977–78 Cypriot First Division was the 39th season of the Cypriot top-level football league.

Overview
It was contested by 16 teams, and AC Omonia won the championship.

League standings

Results

References
Cyprus - List of final tables (RSSSF)

Cypriot First Division seasons
Cypriot First Division, 1977-78
1